Delgamma is a monotypic moth genus of the family Noctuidae erected by Frederic Moore in 1885. Its only species, Delgamma pangonia, the strawberry cutworm, was first described by Achille Guenée in 1852.

Distribution
It is found in tropical countries such as India, Sri Lanka, Bangladesh, the Philippines, Thailand, São Tomé, parts of Africa, and Australia.

Description 
Palpi upturned, where the second joint reaching vertex of head and smoothly scaled, and moderate length third joint. A short frontal tuft present. Antennae fasciculate in male. Thorax and abdomen smoothly scaled. Tibia spineless and moderately hairy. Hind tarsi with first joint fringed above. Forewings with somewhat acute apex. Hindwings of male with the cell short and a large oval depression beyond it, veins 6 and 7 being bent and approaching vein 8. Veins 4 and 5 depressed and running along vein 3 to near margin.

The wingspan is about 4 cm. Adult has bright brown wings, each with a broad pale margin. Forewings have a dark triangle at the tip of each wing tinged with a purplish shine. The caterpillar is humped without tubercles and brownish with grey dots. First two pairs of prolegs reduced. Head pale pinkish to whitish with dark lines. Pupa has a white bloom. The caterpillar is a serious pest on strawberries, as well as other plants in the genus Connarus.

References

External links
"Delgamma pangonia". Lepidoptera Barcode of Life: Australia. Retrieved January 14, 2018. - with images
"Delgamma pangonia (Guenée, 1852)". Lepiforum e.V. Retrieved January 14, 2018. - with images

Calpinae
Moths of Asia
Moths described in 1852
Monotypic moth genera